Justice Seymour may refer to:

Augustus T. Seymour (1907–1965), associate justice of the New Mexico Supreme Court
Edward Woodruff Seymour (1832–1892), associate justice of the Connecticut Supreme Court
Origen S. Seymour (1804–1881), associate justice of the Connecticut Supreme Court

See also
Judge Seymour (disambiguation)